Vahinisaheb is an Indian Marathi-language television drama series which aired on Zee Marathi. It starred Bhargavi Chirmule, Suchitra Bandekar and Prasad Jawade in lead roles.

Cast 
 Bhargavi Chirmule as Bhairavi Vishwas Kirloskar (Vahinisaheb)
 Suchitra Bandekar as Yamini Bhaiyyasaheb Kirloskar (Akkasaheb)
 Vinay Apte as Bhaiyyasaheb Kirolskar
 Prasad Jawade as Vishwas Bhaiyyasaheb Kirloskar
 Sharad Ponkshe as Dharma
 Abhijeet Kelkar as Jaysingh Bhaiyyasaheb Kirloskar
 Sai Ranade as Janaki Jaysingh Kirloskar
 Rugvedi Pradhan as Neha Bhaiyyasaheb Kirloskar
 Sandhya Mhatre as Kalindi

Reception 
Due to its popularity, the show reran on Zee Yuva from 27 July to 22 August 2020.

Airing history

Awards

References

External links 
 
 

Marathi-language television shows
Zee Marathi original programming
2006 Indian television series debuts
2009 Indian television series endings